Simon Szreter is professor of history and public policy at the University of Cambridge, and a fellow of St John's College, Cambridge. He is a specialist in demographic and social history, the history of empirical social science and the relationship between history and public policy issues.

Career
In 2009 Szreter was awarded the Arthur J. Viseltear Prize by the American Public Health Association.

With Keith Breckenridge he edited Registration and Recognition: Documenting the Person in World History which was published by Oxford University Press and the British Academy in 2012 as part of the proceedings of the British Academy based on a workshop held in Cambridge in 2010. In 2019 he was the joint winner of the IPPR's Economics Prize.

He is the co-founder of History and Policy, an international network of historians.

Selected publications
 Fertility, class and gender in Britain 1860-1940 (Cambridge 1996)
 Changing family size in England and Wales 1891-1911:  place, class  and demography (co-authored, Cambridge 2001)
 Categories and contexts. Anthropological and Historical Studies in Critical Demography (co-edited, Oxford 2004)
 Health and Wealth: Studies in History and Policy (Rochester University Press 2005)
 Sex Before the Sexual Revolution: Intimate Life in England 1918-1963. 2010.
 Registration and Recognition: Documenting the Person in World History''. Oxford University Press & The British Academy, 2012. (Edited with Keith Breckenridge) (Proceedings of the British Academy)

References

External links
Professor Simon Szreter, Faculty of History, University of Cambridge
History and Policy website

Living people
Fellows of St John's College, Cambridge
Year of birth missing (living people)